The Shannon Street massacre refers to a shootout that occurred at a house on Shannon Street in Memphis, Tennessee on January 12, 1983. Police officers Ray Schwill and Bobby Hester were called to the house after which a confrontation ensued and Hester was taken hostage by men inside the house. After a 30 hour standoff, Memphis Police officers stormed the house and opened fire, killing all seven captors, after which Hester was found beaten to death. The police's handling of the incident was controversial and led to changes in Memphis police procedure.

The incident 
On January 11, 1983, Memphis police were called to 2239 Shannon Street to investigate an alleged purse snatching. Inside the home was Lindberg Sanders-- a man with a history of mental illness and who called himself "Black Jesus"-- and thirteen other men who were his followers. Sanders harbored a strong hatred for law enforcement and had told his followers that the world would end on January 10, 1983. 

Officers Ray Schwill and Bobby Hester responded to the call. Seven cultists fled the house at this point, but were later captured. Upon arrival, Schwill and Hester were ambushed by the remaining men in the house. Schwill sustained a gunshot wound to the face and escaped, but Hester was taken hostage. Schwill radioed for help and police quickly surrounded the house.

The first backup officer to arrive attempted to enter the house, but immediately came under fire and was wounded. A second officer entered the house and exchanged gunfire with the cultists. After getting off twelve shots from his service revolver, the officer retreated from the building, retrieved a shotgun, and continued firing into the house. 

Police began negotiations with Sanders, who stated that he wanted to broadcast the murder of a police officer over a Memphis radio station and that any attempt by officers to enter the house would result in Hester being beaten to death. Hester could be heard on the police radio begging for help.  After 30 hours of negotiations with no resolution, a police SWAT raided the house. During the 20-minute raid, police fired tear gas into the house and made a dynamic entry. At this point, the cultists opened fire on the SWAT team with the two .38-caliber service revolvers stolen from Schwill and Hester. The SWAT team returned fire with M16 carbines and 12-gauge shotguns, killing all seven remaining cultists, including Sanders. Police then discovered the body of Hester, who had been beaten and stabbed to death several hours earlier.

Deaths

Aftermath 
Many police officers (and citizens) were angered by the Memphis Police's waiting 30 hours to finally raid the house. Officers of the assault team wanted to raid the house once they heard Hester screaming, but police administrators wanted to keep negotiating. By the time they were authorized to raid, Hester had been dead for several hours.

Members of Sanders' family and Memphis' African-American community disputed the police's version of events. Sanders' daughter Lucinda claimed that Officer Schwill had started the confrontation at the house by shoving Lindberg Sanders. Schwill was known to mimic African-American speech when interacting with African-Americans, which could have been taken as an insult.  Sanders' wife Dorothy alleged that all the men were executed in retaliation for the killing of Hester. Julian Bolton, a Shelby County Commissioner at the time, criticized the police response as excessive, as he felt that not everyone in the house was responsible for Hester's death. Bolton also noted how six of the seven captors were shot in the head and that their bodies were photographed lying next to each other, which Bolton stated indicates that they were shot execution-style. An FBI investigation found no wrongdoing on the part of the police.

After the incident, Memphis Police adopted a policy of immediate raids for hostage situations if a hostage has been injured. Memphis Police also implemented more training on how to de-escalate crisis situations, particularly with mentally ill subjects.

References

1983 murders in the United States
1983 in Tennessee
African-American history of Tennessee
Armed standoffs in the United States
Deaths by firearm in Tennessee
History of Memphis, Tennessee
January 1983 events in the United States
+Shannon
Law enforcement operations in the United States